The Hear After is the third studio album by American hip hop artist J-Live. It was released on Penalty Recordings on July 19, 2005.

Critical reception

Nathan Rabin of The A.V. Club gave the album a favorable review, saying: "Gangsta rappers might like to think of their songs as dispatches from war zones, but The Hear After is more like a nice conversation with an old friend following a long separation."

Track listing

References

External links
 

2005 albums
J-Live albums